Nosavana is a genus of longhorn beetles of the subfamily Lamiinae, containing the following species:

 Nosavana laosensis (Breuning, 1963)
 Nosavana phoumii Breuning, 1963

References

Gyaritini
Taxa named by Stephan von Breuning (entomologist)